William A. Hinton (1862–1920) was a Minnesota State Republican Senator for the Thirteenth District in the 35th and 36th Legislative sessions, serving years 1907–1910. Before becoming a Senator, he was a representative in the years of 1903 through 1905. He also served as the town clerk of Nashville, Martin County, Minnesota for twelve years. His city of residence was Truman, Minnesota when elected which remained the same throughout his time in the Senate. Born in Wisconsin in 1862, he moved to Minnesota in 1864, his occupation as a merchant. He died in 1920 at age 58, the specific dates of birth and death are unknown.

References 

1862 births
1920 deaths
People from Wisconsin
People from Martin County, Minnesota
Businesspeople from Minnesota
Minnesota state senators
Members of the Minnesota House of Representatives